Monj-e Sofla (also Romanized as Monj-e Soflá; also known as Monj-e Pā’īn, Mūnj, and Qal‘eh-ye Pā’īn) is a village in Sarvestan Rural District, in the Central District of Bavanat County, Fars Province, Iran. At the 2006 census, its population was 423, in 121 families.

References 

Populated places in Bavanat County